Kevin Mack (born July 23, 1959) is an American visual effects artist. He won at the 71st Academy Awards in the category of Best Visual Effects for his work on What Dreams May Come. He shared his Academy Award with Nicholas Brooks, Joel Hynek and Stuart Robertson.

Career 
Kevin Mack is the founder of Shape Space VR. Through Shape Space, Mack has created and produced virtual reality experiences including Zen Parade, Blortasia, and Anandala.

Personal life

His wife Snow Mack is an artist and his father was a Disney animator.

References

External links

Living people
Best Visual Effects Academy Award winners
1959 births
Artists from Los Angeles
Special effects people